The 2013 Individual Speedway World Championship Grand Prix Qualification were a series of motorcycle speedway meetings used to determine the three riders who qualified for the 2013 Speedway Grand Prix.

Qualifying rounds

Race-offs

Grand Prix Challenge 
29 September 2012
 Goričan

See also 
 2012 Speedway Grand Prix

References 

2013 Speedway Grand Prix
Grand Prix Qualification
Speedway Grand Prix Qualifications